Ankla (correctly: "Ancla" meaning anchor in Spanish) is an American heavy metal band from Los Angeles, California.

History
Ankla was formed in 2001 by Puya guitarist Ramón Ortiz. The band independently released a self-titled 7-track EP in 2002, produced by Stone Sour drummer Roy Mayorga.

On April 8, 2006, it was announced that Ankla  signed with Bieler Bros. Records. Their debut album Steep Trails was produced by Bob Marlette, and was released on July 25, 2006.

In 2007, Ankla played the second stage at Ozzfest. In 2008, the band's line up changed, replacing former singer Ikaro Stafford with Eddie Macias, who had previously worked with Ramón Ortíz in the early stages of Puya.

Music style
IGN described Ankla's style of music as a mixture of "thrash metal, metalcore and death metal".

Members

 Ramón Ortíz - guitars (2001–present)
 Oscar Santiago - percussion (2005–present), drums (2011-present)

Former

 Ikaro Stafford Santana - vocals (2001–2007)
 Danny Estrada - drums (2001-2002)
 Anthony Jiménez - percussion (2001-2004)
 Edgar González - bass (2001–2006)
 Aaron Rossi - drums (2002–2006)
Rik Barba - bass (2009 - 2011)
 Tony Castaneda - bass (2006-2009)
 Pepe Clarke Magaña - drums (2006-2010)
 Eddie Macias - vocals (2008-2010)
 Nick Moreno - vocals (2011)
 Jason MacGuire (Evil J) - bass (2011)
 Dantai Lopez - percussion (2011)

Discography
 Ankla (2002)
 Steep Trails (2006)
 Persistence (2010)

References

External links
 Ankla on Myspace
 

Heavy metal musical groups from California
Bieler Bros. Records artists
Musical groups from Los Angeles